The 2013–14 College of Charleston Cougars men's basketball team represented the College of Charleston during the 2013–14 NCAA Division I men's basketball season. The Cougars, led by second year head coach Doug Wojcik, played their home games at the TD Arena and were first year members of the Colonial Athletic Association. They finished the season 14–18, 6–10 in CAA play to finish in a tie for sixth place. They lost in the quarterfinals of the CAA tournament to William & Mary.

Roster

Schedule

|-
!colspan=9 style="background:#800000; color:#F0E68C;"| Exhibition

|-
!colspan=9 style="background:#800000; color:#F0E68C;"| Regular season

|-
!colspan=9 style="background:#800000; color:#F0E68C;"| 2014 CAA tournament

References

College of Charleston Cougars men's basketball seasons
College of Charleston
Charleston
Charleston